The 1925 Georgia Bulldogs football team was an American football team that represented the University of Georgia as a member of the Southern Conference during the 1925 season. In its third season under head coach George Cecil Woodruff, Georgia compiled a 4–5 season (2–4 against conference opponents) and outscored opponents by a total of 133 to 91. Smack Thompson was the team captain. The team played its home games at Sanford Field in Athens, Georgia.

The 1925 season was George Cecil Woodruff's only losing season during his five-year tenure as Georgia's head coach.  In 1925, Georgia played Georgia Tech for the first time since 1916, losing 3–0 in Atlanta.

Schedule

References

External links 

 

Georgia
Georgia Bulldogs football seasons
Georgia Bulldogs football